In molecular biology, a reporter gene (often simply reporter) is a gene that researchers attach to a regulatory sequence of another gene of interest in bacteria, cell culture, animals or plants. Such genes are called reporters because the characteristics they confer on organisms expressing them are easily identified and measured, or because they are selectable markers. Reporter genes are often used as an indication of whether a certain gene has been taken up by or expressed in the cell or organism population.

Common reporter genes
To introduce a reporter gene into an organism, scientists place the reporter gene and the gene of interest in the same DNA construct to be inserted into the cell or organism. For bacteria or prokaryotic cells in culture, this is usually in the form of a circular DNA molecule called a plasmid. For viruses, this is known as a viral vector. It is important to use a reporter gene that is not natively expressed in the cell or organism under study, since the expression of the reporter is being used as a marker for successful uptake of the gene of interest.

Commonly used reporter genes that induce visually identifiable characteristics usually involve fluorescent and luminescent proteins. Examples include the gene that encodes jellyfish green fluorescent protein (GFP), which causes cells that express it to glow green under blue light, the enzyme luciferase, which catalyzes a reaction with luciferin to produce light, and the red fluorescent protein from the gene . The GUS gene has been commonly used in plants but luciferase and GFP are becoming more common.

A common reporter in bacteria is the E. coli lacZ gene, which encodes the protein beta-galactosidase. This enzyme causes bacteria expressing the gene to appear blue when grown on a medium that contains the substrate analog X-gal. An example of a selectable marker which is also a reporter in bacteria is the chloramphenicol acetyltransferase (CAT) gene, which confers resistance to the antibiotic chloramphenicol.

Transformation and transfection assays
Many methods of transfection and transformation – two ways of expressing a foreign or modified gene in an organism – are effective in only a small percentage of a population subjected to the techniques. Thus, a method for identifying those few successful gene uptake events is necessary. Reporter genes used in this way are normally expressed under their own promoter (DNA regions that initiates gene transcription) independent from that of the introduced gene of interest; the reporter gene can be expressed constitutively (that is, it is "always on") or inducibly with an external intervention such as the introduction of Isopropyl β-D-1-thiogalactopyranoside (IPTG) in the β-galactosidase system. As a result, the reporter gene's expression is independent of the gene of interest's expression, which is an advantage when the gene of interest is only expressed under certain specific conditions or in tissues that are difficult to access.

In the case of selectable-marker reporters such as CAT, the transfected population of bacteria can be grown on a substrate that contains chloramphenicol. Only those cells that have successfully taken up the construct containing the CAT gene will survive and multiply under these conditions.

Gene expression assays
Reporter genes can be used to assay for the expression of a gene of interest that is normally difficult to quantitatively assay. Reporter genes can produce a protein that has little obvious or immediate effect on the cell culture or organism. They are ideally not present in the native genome to be able to isolate reporter gene expression as a result of the gene of interest's expression.

To activate reporter genes, they can be expressed constitutively, where they are directly attached to the gene of interest to create a gene fusion. This method is an example of using cis-acting elements where the two genes are under the same promoter elements and are transcribed into a single messenger RNA molecule. The mRNA is then translated into protein. It is important that both proteins be able to properly fold into their active conformations and interact with their substrates despite being fused. In building the DNA construct, a segment of DNA coding for a flexible polypeptide linker region is usually included so that the reporter and the gene product will only minimally interfere with one another. Reporter genes can also be expressed by induction during growth. In these cases, trans-acting elements, such as transcription factors are used to express the reporter gene.

Reporter gene assay have been increasingly used in high throughput screening (HTS) to identify small molecule inhibitors and activators of protein targets and pathways for drug discovery and chemical biology.  Because the reporter enzymes themselves (e.g. firefly luciferase) can be direct targets of small molecules and confound the interpretation of HTS data, novel coincidence reporter designs incorporating artifact suppression have been developed.

Promoter assays
Reporter genes can be used to assay for the activity of a particular promoter in a cell or organism. In this case there is no separate "gene of interest"; the reporter gene is simply placed under the control of the target promoter and the reporter gene product's activity is quantitatively measured. The results are normally reported relative to the activity under a "consensus" promoter known to induce strong gene expression.

Further uses
A more complex use of reporter genes on a large scale is in two-hybrid screening, which aims to identify proteins that natively interact with one another in vivo.

See also
 GUS reporter system

References

External links
Research highlights and updated information on reporter genes.
Staining Whole Mouse Embryos for β-Galactosidase (lacZ) Activity

Biochemistry detection methods
Genetics techniques
Molecular biology

es:Gen reportero